The 1912 Montana gubernatorial election was held on November 5, 1912.

Democratic nominee Sam V. Stewart defeated Republican nominee Harry L. Wilson, Progressive nominee Frank J. Edwards and Socialist nominee Lewis Johnstone Duncan with 31.81% of the vote.

General election

Candidates
Sam V. Stewart, Democratic, lawyer, former Chairman of the Democratic State Central Committee
Harry L. Wilson, Republican, lawyer
Frank J. Edwards, Progressive, former mayor of Helena
Lewis Johnstone Duncan, Socialist, Mayor of Butte, candidate for Montana's at-large congressional district in 1908

Results

References

Bibliography
 
 

1912
Montana
Gubernatorial